Trump Towers is an oceanfront condominium development in Sunny Isles Beach, Florida consisting of three 271-unit towers with developer Gil Dezer of Dezer Properties. The three identical towers are designed by the Miami based company Sieger Suarez Architects. The luxurious indoor design is by Hirsch Bedner Associates with a three-story atrium, restaurant, fitness center, spa, and pool deck in each tower.

See also
 List of tallest buildings in Sunny Isles Beach

References

External links
 
 
 

Buildings and structures in Miami-Dade County, Florida
Residential condominiums in the United States
Skyscrapers in Florida
Residential skyscrapers in Florida